Gurat is a commune in the Charente department in southwestern France.

Geography
The Lizonne forms the commune's southeastern border.

Population

See also
Communes of the Charente department

References

Communes of Charente
Charente communes articles needing translation from French Wikipedia